Flypaper is a 2011 American crime comedy film starring Patrick Dempsey and Ashley Judd, and directed by Rob Minkoff and written by Jon Lucas and Scott Moore. It was released on August 19, 2011.

It's a slapstick spoof, a parody of bank heist movies plus technobabble, and some explosions, with Murphy's Law sprinkled throughout.

Plot
Just before closing time, bank teller Kaitlin has one last customer, Tripp, who wants $100 broken into a quirky, specific combination of coins. As he flirts with her, the bank is simultaneously attacked by two groups of robbers: a trio of high-tech professionals with machine guns, there for the vault and duo rednecks who walk in with a revolver and a shotgun, for the ATM.

Tripp, sensing a gunfight, jumps the counter to keep both himself and Kaitlin safe, as the two groups open fire on each other. A bystander (possibly an agent) is quickly shot and killed. Tripp steps in, suggesting a truce between the groups and rob what they initially planned to, concurrently. The eight hostages are taken upstairs, locked in the kitchen and the windows are blackened.

The trio get frustrated with the ATM thieves' lack of sophistication. They don't use masks, have conspicuous tattoos, smash-and-grab types who use an excessive amount of plastic explosives, blowing out several windows. The duo watch the other team, in awe of their technical savvy, with their fancy steel-cased laptops, helmets with night-vision goggles, and great firepower.

Tripp's overactive mind and heightened senses, probably due to the absence of medication, brings out his amateur sleuthing skills. He asks a barrage of questions to Kaitlin, based on his keen observational skills, in regards to her supposed wealthy fiancé. Breaking down some of the puzzling details of the heists to the others, such as the man shot dead in the lobby, Tripp guesses that 'coincidences' were intentional. Also, he finds night vision goggles hidden in the bathroom. Mitch is discovered to have sold Intel about when the reboot would take place, leaving the system vulnerable for 10 minutes, around closing time.

The ATM thieves and racist, trigger-happy Gates check their rankings on the FBI's most wanted for banks, the top is Vicellous Drum, the second Mick Nylon, the third is Alexis Black, Darrien and Weinstein at 12, Gates at 68 (fourth at cyber), and the pair at 674, with photos included.

Tripp volunteers to help the ATM robbers so he can figure out who shot the ‘bystander’. Carrying an FBI issue gun, the bullet that killed him came from the balcony above, concluding it was Weinstein. Directly afterwards, they suspiciously find Mitch and Weinstein shot dead, looking like they shot each other. D’arriens decides to abandon ship. He doesn't find the key, so he tries to use the blowtorch, but it's rigged to blow up.

Down to seven hostages and three criminals, Gates takes charge. He hooks up the vault door, sending ‘Jelly’ to check on a noise. Tripp easily distracts him, showing him the faulty detonators, proving someone is sabotaging them. Jelly shows him a fax from their point man Vicellous Drum. He and PB once acted as decoys so he could rob a bank. Gates produces a fax from their point man. Tripp discovers ‘Swiss miss’ dead in a cupboard with yet another fax, summoning her to the bank at the same time as the others.

Tripp concludes that all has not been a robbery, but a plan to take out as many people as possible, the FBI agent, both criminal teams, the Swiss bank rep, his hacker Mitchell, and who knows who else. Gates blows the vault, but Tripp warns them it's a trap, like flypaper is. He and Kaitlin trick Drum into going for the nightvision goggles, which works, but he still rubs out the ex-con bank guard and Gates.

The robbers (among others) were lured here, with misleading blueprints and defective equipment, so that Vicellous Drum (the bank manager, Gordon Blythe) could kill them to cover his own trail. Once Kaitlin and Tripp expose him, he tries to bribe everyone with millions, but heavily armed, they blow him away.

Afterwards, the ATM pair escape with bags of money, Rex and Madge stay on and Kaitlin and Tripp drive off with her ‘wedding presents’, (boxes of money) carried out for her by bank security guards. Tripp fell for Kaitlin while hostage and it turns out she was the biggest thief herself, knowing of Blythe-Drum's plan all along. She is, in fact, Alexis Black (and he possibly Mick Nylon).

Cast
 Patrick Dempsey as Tripp, a bank customer
 Ashley Judd as Kaitlin, a teller
 Tim Blake Nelson as Billy Ray 'Peanut Butter' McCloud
 Mekhi Phifer as D'arriens (DMX), professional thief
 Matt Ryan as Gates, professional thief
 Jeffrey Tambor as Gordon Blythe, the bank manager
 John Ventimiglia as Weinstein, professional thief
 Pruitt Taylor Vince as Wyatt 'Jelly' Jenkins
 Curtis Armstrong as Mitchell Wolf, bank computer technician 
 Rob Huebel as Rex Newbauer, a loan officer
 Adrian Martinez as Mr. Clean, the guard
 Natalia Safran as 'Swiss Miss'
 Octavia Spencer as Madge Wiggins, a teller
 Eddie Matthews as Jack Hayes, the undercover agent
 Rob Boltin as Credit Manager

Production
The writers of the film, Jon Lucas and Scott Moore, also wrote the screenplay for The Hangover. The director, Rob Minkoff, is well known for co-directing The Lion King.
Filming took place in Baton Rouge, Louisiana, in June 2010. The opening animatic sequence was created by Geefwee Boedoe. Boedoe had been planning to fully animate the sequence, but due to budget and because Minkoff enjoyed the animatic so much, he decided to use that in the final product.

Reception
On Rotten Tomatoes the film has an approval rating of 16% based on reviews from 19 critics.

It grossed only $1,100 total in its theatrical release at one theater on two screens with no advertising.

References

External links
 
 
 

2011 films
2011 comedy films
2010s crime comedy films
American crime comedy films
Films about bank robbery
Films directed by Rob Minkoff
Films scored by John Swihart
Films shot in Louisiana
Films with screenplays by Jon Lucas and Scott Moore
2010s English-language films
2010s American films